Mpho Benjamin Links (born 20 June 1996) is a South African athlete specialising in the high jump. He won a bronze medal at the 2018 African Championships.

His personal best in the event was 2.25 metres set in Germiston in 2019, mark he improved with 2.27 m in Potchefstroom (RSA) on 29 April 2021.

Competition record

References

External links
 

1996 births
Living people
South African male high jumpers
Athletes (track and field) at the 2015 African Games
Athletes (track and field) at the 2019 African Games
African Games gold medalists for South Africa
African Games medalists in athletics (track and field)
South African Athletics Championships winners
African Games gold medalists in athletics (track and field)
Competitors at the 2015 Summer Universiade
Competitors at the 2017 Summer Universiade
Competitors at the 2019 Summer Universiade